Radioactive, LLC is an Ohio limited liability company with extensive business interests in the commercial radio broadcasting industry. It holds many FCC frequency allocation licenses won in FCC spectrum auctions. The sole owner of Radioactive, LLC is Randy Michaels, former CEO of Clear Channel Communications and The Tribune Company. The business office of record is located in Fort Wright, Kentucky.

References 
"Ownership Report for Commercial Broadcast Stations - File # BON-20071011ABQ", Federal Communications Commission, Retrieved March 4, 2010.

Radio broadcasting companies of the United States
American companies established in 2000
2000 establishments in Ohio